National Secondary Route 177, or just Route 177 (or ) is a National Road Route of Costa Rica, located in the San José province.

Description
In San José province the route covers San José canton (Mata Redonda, Hatillo districts), Escazú canton (Escazú, San Rafael districts), Alajuelita canton (San Felipe district).

References

Highways in Costa Rica